Cory Thomas Mee (born February 14, 1970) is an American college baseball coach and former third baseman, who is the current associate head baseball coach and catching coach for the Western Michigan Broncos. Mee grew up in Hilton, New York and graduated from Hilton High School in 1988. He played college baseball at the University of Notre Dame from 1989 to 1992, before playing professionally for the Yakima Bears in 1992. He served as the head coach at the University of Toledo from 2004 to 2019.

Coaching career
Mee was named the head coach of the Rockets in 2004. On May 20, 2019, Mee stepped down from his position as head coach at Toledo. On September 4, 2019, Mee was named the volunteer assistant baseball coach at Eastern Michigan University. On July 16, 2020 he was named the associate head coach for the University of Akron.

Head coaching record
This table shows Mee's record as a college coach.

References

External links

Toledo profile

1970 births
Living people
Akron Zips baseball coaches
Eastern Michigan Eagles baseball coaches
Michigan State Spartans baseball coaches
Notre Dame Fighting Irish baseball coaches
Notre Dame Fighting Irish baseball players
RIT Tigers baseball coaches
Toledo Rockets baseball coaches
Western Michigan Broncos baseball coaches
Yakima Bears players
People from Monroe County, New York
Sportspeople from Jamestown, New York
Baseball coaches from New York (state)
Baseball players from New York (state)